Lucius Cincinnatus may refer to:

Lucius Quinctius Cincinnatus, ancient Roman politician of the 5th and 6th centuries BC
Lucius Quintus Cincinnatus Lamar I (1797–1834), father of Lucius Quintus Cincinnatus Lamar (II) and a Georgia jurist
Lucius Quintus Cincinnatus Lamar (1825–1893), U.S. Supreme Court Associate Justice